Accrington railway station serves the town of Accrington in Lancashire, England.

It is also served by Caldervale Line express services between Blackpool North, Leeds and York.

History
The station was opened on 10 June 1848 by the East Lancashire Railway, which amalgamated with the Lancashire & Yorkshire Railway in 1859. Taken into the London, Midland & Scottish Railway during the Grouping of 1923, the line then passed on to the London Midland Region of British Railways on nationalisation in 1948.

The station was formerly a major junction on the ELR, with the line to Bury and Salford diverging southwards from that towards Blackburn and Preston at the western end of the station, just before the impressive viaduct that carries the line over the town centre.

This was, for many years, a busy commuter route carrying regular trains from Skipton and Colne to Manchester Victoria, but it fell victim to the Beeching cuts in the sixties and closed to passengers on 5 December 1966.  Few traces of this route remain today, the formation through the town (including part of the notorious 1 in 40 Baxenden Bank) having been built over.

When Sectorisation was introduced, the station was served by Regional Railways until the Privatisation of British Railways.

In April 2006, the body of a dead man was found slumped on the platform, thus closing the station for twelve hours. In July 2006, it was reported the dead man was in a very drunk state. In February 2008, another dead body of a man was found on the station.

Buildings and structures
The station has two side platforms, flanking the twin-track railway line. Other than three small shelters (two on platform 2 and one on platform one) there is no protection from the elements; indeed, even with the recent improvements, the whole impression is one of a basic halt. It offers disabled access via ramps adjacent to the platforms.

In 2011, the station underwent a major rebuild, as part of a project to create a model of sustainable energy use for a railway station. This redevelopment cost £2 million, of which £500,000 was funded by the European Union's Interreg IVB programme. The previously existing ticket office has been demolished, and was replaced by a new build and constructed, where possible, with local materials including recycled stone. The building uses a rainwater harvesting system, photovoltaic cells and solar hot water generation panels on the new tower.

Services
There is an hourly service from Accrington to Blackpool North via  (westbound) and York (eastbound) on the Calder Valley line. This now also runs hourly on Sundays since the May 2009 timetable change, though it was suspended beyond Burnley (with a replacement bus connection to/from Hebden Bridge) due to ongoing engineering work at Holme Tunnel between November 2013 and late March 2014.

These call at Blackburn, Preston, Poulton-Le-Flyde and Blackpool North westbound and Burnley Manchester Road, Hebden Bridge, Halifax, Bradford Interchange, New Pudsey, Leeds, Church Fenton and York eastbound. Through trains to York restarted in December 2018 (these now run express east of Leeds, calling only at Church Fenton).

On the East Lancashire Line, Monday to Saturday daytimes, there is an hourly service from Accrington to Preston (westbound) and Colne (eastbound). There was also a solitary Mon to Fri morning commuter service from Colne to Manchester Victoria that formerly called here, along with a corresponding return working during the evening. This was however withdrawn at the May 2009 timetable change (it was diverted to run to  instead).

These call at all stops (except Salwick), including the major stations of Preston, Blackburn and Burnley Central.

From May 2015, direct services to Manchester Victoria resumed (after a gap of almost fifty years) with the reopening of the  Curve. These start at Blackburn and continue onwards through Burnley Manchester Road, using the Caldervale Line south of Todmorden to reach  and Manchester. An hourly service each way operates on this route throughout the week.

References

Bibliography
 
 
 Marshall, J. (1981) Forgotten Railways: North-West England, David & Charles, Newton Abbott.

External links

 Interactive plan of the station
 Station on navigable O.S. map

Accrington
Former Lancashire and Yorkshire Railway stations
Railway stations in Hyndburn
DfT Category E stations
Railway stations in Great Britain opened in 1848
Northern franchise railway stations